Linda Kent is an American-born harpsichord & chamber organ player. Together with Genevieve Lacey Kent was nominated for the 2002 ARIA Award for Best Classical Album for the album Piracy. Piracy, sub titled Baroque music stolen for the recorder, was recorded in March 2000 and released through ABC Classics in 2002.

Discography

Awards and nominations

ARIA Music Awards
The ARIA Music Awards is an annual awards ceremony that recognises excellence, innovation, and achievement across all genres of Australian music. They commenced in 1987. 

! 
|-
| 2002
| Piracy (with Genevieve Lacey)
| Best Classical Album
| 
| 
|-

References

Living people
Year of birth missing (living people)
American harpsichordists
Women harpsichordists
Women organists